Bernadette Kanter is a French sculptor born in Saint-Étienne-du-Rouvray (Normandy) in 1950, her preferred material is bronze.

Biography 
In 1974, after studying at the College of artistic careers of Paris (ICART), at the École nationale supérieure des Beaux-Arts in Paris, and the Académie de la Grande Chaumière in Montparnasse in Paris, Kanter established her studio in Buchelay, near Paris.
In addition she continued to study gemology and gained work experience in workshops of sculpture, sculpting, molding, casting and direct carving.

In 2002 Kanter created Dogs of the bridge guard at Mantes-la-Jolie, near Paris, which consists of two bronze sculptures guarding the entrance to the city after the bridge Peronnet. In 2004 she created an aircraft-bird figure for Aérospatiale, Nungesser and Colis.

Works
 1990 The music museum Neunkirchen, (Germany)
 1991 Order and force  Ministry of Interior, mural for the hall of the police station at Nogent-sur-Marne
 1993 The Rooster Urban District of Mantes-la-Jolie
 1994 Cockfight Buchelay
 1998 The large eagle Buchelay
 1998 City Council signalitiques Buchelay, seven terracotta panels for la Maison pour tous
 1998 Fontaine fishermen Belgium
 2000 Big horse Vésinet
 2002 The Bridge guard dogs Mantes-la-Jolie
 2004 Nungesser and Colis Aérospatiale
 2007 Fresco Shut' Fat (North-East of Jerusalem) Limay Town Hall

Awards
 1988 Second Grand-Prix at the International Biennial of Quebec (Canada)
 1995 Gold Medal at the National exhibition of wildlife artists
 1999 Silver Medal of the Academy of Arts Sciences and Letters in Paris
 2001 Gold Medal for Sculpture French artists Sociétaires Taylor Foundation

References

External links
 https://web.archive.org/web/20110720222450/http://mantes.histoire.free.fr/item.php?id=955
 http://www.fondationtaylor.com/ 
 http://www.grande-chaumiere.fr/
 https://web.archive.org/web/20101203111414/http://www.icartparis.com/
 https://web.archive.org/web/20110409124245/http://www.ensba.fr/

1950 births
Living people
Artists from Paris
20th-century French sculptors
20th-century French women artists
21st-century French sculptors
21st-century French women artists
Alumni of the Académie de la Grande Chaumière